HNLMS K XVI was one of five s built for the Royal Netherlands Navy (RNN). Entering service in 1934, the submarine was deployed to the Netherlands East Indies. A day later, the Dutch submarine was torpedoed by the Japanese submarine I-66 (later renumbered to be I-166) off Borneo, with all aboard killed. The wreck of K XVI was rediscovered in October 2011 by a group of recreational divers.

Construction
K XVI was ordered from Rotterdam-based shipbuilder Rotterdamsche Droogdok Maatschappij on 30 May 1929, and was laid down on 31 May 1930. The submarine was launched on 8 April 1933, and commissioned into the RNN on 31 January 1934.

Operational history
In January 1935, the boat was deployed to the Netherlands East Indies. She remained in this area after the start of World War II.

The destroyer's aft magazine caught fire and exploded, sinking the ship with 121 of the 241 personnel aboard killed. Later that evening, the submarine attempted to attack the destroyer , but was fended off by depth charges.

K XVI was torpedoed by the  a day later, and sank with all 36 aboard. The boat was one of seven Dutch submarines lost during World War II.

On 25 October 2011, the Dutch Ministry of Defence announced that the wreck of K XVI had been found by Australian and Singaporean recreational divers off the northern coast of Borneo.

Citations

References
Books

News articles

1933 ships
Ships sunk by Japanese submarines
K XIV-class submarines
Lost submarines of the Netherlands
World War II shipwrecks in the South China Sea
Maritime incidents in December 1941
Ships lost with all hands
Submarines sunk by submarines
Submarines built by Rotterdamsche Droogdok Maatschappij